Rikillagaskada is a village in Sri Lanka. It is located within Central Province.

Poramadulla Central College is located in the village.

See also

List of towns in Central Province, Sri Lanka

References
 Ferguson, Alastair MacKenzie. Ferguson's Ceylon Directory - Volume 109. Associated Newspapers of Ceylon Limited, 1967.

Notes

External links

Populated places in Kandy District
Grama Niladhari divisions of Sri Lanka